Bacillus mojavensis is a bacterium. Bacillus axarquiensis and Bacillus malacitensis are considered later heterotypic synonyms of B. mojavensis. It is named after the Mojave Desert.

References

Further reading

External links
 LPSN
 
 Type strain of Bacillus mojavensis at BacDive -  the Bacterial Diversity Metadatabase

mojavensis
Gram-positive bacteria
Bacteria described in 1994